State Route 373 (SR 373) is a  state highway in Nye County, Nevada, United States. It is a highway connecting California State Route 127 to U.S. Route 95, providing southern Nye County access to the eastern areas of Death Valley National Park.

Route description

The highway heads almost due north from this location, passing through the Amargosa Valley. On the west side of the highway, the farm lands and homes of the community of Amargosa Valley come into view. The route continues north from here to its terminus at US 95, near the former site of Lathrop Wells.

History

An unimproved road through Amargosa Valley, connecting Nevada to Death Valley Junction, appears on state maps as early as 1927.  This route crossed the state line roughly where the current highway crosses now, but instead veered northwest to State Route 5 (now US 95) southwest of Beatty near the now defunct town of Caracca. The road, which paralleled the tracks of the Tonopah and Tidewater Railroad to the west, was recognized as State Route 29 by 1932.  By 1935, SR 29 had been moved to a new, paved roadway resembling the alignment of the present-day highway.

SR 29 remained unchanged for several years, until July 1, 1976.  At that time, it was rechristened as State Route 373 as part of the 1976 renumbering of Nevada's state highways.  State highway maps first reflected this change in 1978.

Major intersections

References

373
373
Transportation in Nye County, Nevada